Coronation Day is the anniversary of the coronation of a monarch, the day a king or queen is formally crowned and invested with the regalia.

By country

Cambodia
 Norodom Sihamoni - October 29, 2004

Ethiopia
 Haile Selassie I - November 2, 1930

Thailand
 Mongkut - May 15, 1851
 Chulalongkorn - November 11, 1868 (1st)November 16, 1873 (2nd)
 Vajiravudh - November 11, 1910
 Prajadhipok - February 25, 1926
 Bhumibol Adulyadej - May 5, 1950
 Vajiralongkorn - May 4, 2019

United Kingdom and predecessor states

 Anne - 23 April 1702
 George I - 20 October 1714
 George II - 11 October 1727
 George III - 22 September 1761
 George IV - 19 July 1821
 William IV - 8 September 1831
 Victoria - 28 June 1838
 Edward VII - 9 August 1902
 George V - 22 June 1911
 George VI - 12 May 1937
 Elizabeth II - 2 June 1953
 Charles III - 6 May 2023

See also
 Accession day
 Coronation of the Danish monarch#Historical list of coronations
 Coronation of the Holy Roman Emperor#List of Roman imperial coronations

External links
 BBC Coronation page
 Alexandra Palace Television Society

Anniversaries
State ritual and ceremonies
Monarchy in Canada
day